Rabbi Yisroel Szapira of Grodzhisk was a Hasidic rebbe in Poland. His father, Chayim Meir Yechiel, was the son of the Grodzhisk Rebbe, Elimelech Szapira. When his grandfather died, some of the Chassidim chose Yisroel as the new Rebbe, others chose to wait for the young son who would eventually become the Piasezner Rebbe.

Writings
The teachings of Yisrael Szapira are called Emunat Yisrael (on Torah) and Binat Yisrael (a second work on Torah)

Death
Yisroel Szapira was killed at the Treblinka Extermination Camp. At the beginning of Emunat Yisrael there is an account of the event:

When the people entered the camp, the community of thousands, into Treblinka; the people asked the Rebbe: "What can we say now"? So the Rebbe answered softly, "Listen my brothers and sisters, the Godly nation, it's not for us to understand the actions of God and if it has been decreed for us that at this time we are to be the korbanot (sacrifices) for the birth pangs of the Messiah, this is a great and lofty level of the redemption. We should rejoice in our fortune, just as Chazal (Talmudic Sages) say "Let the Messiah come, but I should not see it" that means he's not yet here. But we, when we reach this level, we must rejoice because we merited that our ashes will purify the whole of Am Yisrael (the Nation of Israel). Thus we are obligated to not hesitate and to not cry as we walk into the furnace; we must be happy, while singing Ani Ma'amin (I believe with perfect faith. And just as Rabbi Akiva did when he was murdered we will say the Shema Yisrael when the time comes.

The community fulfilled his holy words, sang the Ani Ma'amin, and recited the Shema Yisrael in the ultimate sanctification of God's name.

External links
 [Emunas Yisroel|http://hebrewbooks.org/3894]
 [Binas Yisroel|http://hebrewbooks.org/3863]

Polish Orthodox rabbis
Hasidic rebbes